Kahn-e Magar (also Romanized as Kahn-e Magār; also known as Kahmagār, Kahmgar, Kāmāgār, and Kāmgār) is a village in Zaboli Rural District, in the Central District of Mehrestan County, Sistan and Baluchestan Province, Iran. At the 2006 census, its population was 915, in 215 families.

References 

Populated places in Mehrestan County